William Yancy Bell (or William Yancey Bell) (February 23, 1887 – April 10, 1962) received a Ph.D. from Yale University in 1924 was a sometime follower of Marcus Garvey and became a bishop of the Christian Methodist Episcopal Church .

At Yale he specialized in the Department of Semitic Languahes and Letters.

Dr. Bell was very active in civil rights issues as evidenced by his being a member of a Negro delegation to visit President Harry Truman to get him to integrate the U.S. Armed Forces. He worked with W. E. B. Dubois and ordained Martin Luther King Jr. on January 17, 1942, when King was 13 years old.

References

Bell WY.  THE MUTAWAKKILI OF AS-SUYUTI.  New Haven:  Yale University, 1924
Bardoplph R. The Negro Vanguard.  New York:  Rinehart & Co, Inc., 1959; 
Burkett R.K. Black Redemption:  Churchmen Speak for the Garvey Movement.  Philadelphia:  Temple University Press, 1978.

American Methodist bishops
Yale Divinity School alumni
Clergy of historically African-American Christian denominations
1887 births
1962 deaths